Cavalier is an album by Tom Brosseau, released in 2007. It was produced by John Parish (PJ Harvey, Giant Sand) and engineered by Ali Chant at Toy Box Studios in Bristol, U.K.

Album insight 
Artwork from Cavalier was created by DLT and meant to emulate Black Sparrow Press, whose vibrant title page and cover design colors and shapes were created by Barbara Martin.

The photo used for the album was taken in Portland, Oregon by American photographer, Lars Topelmann.

Track listing
"Amory"
"Brass Ring Blues"
"Committed to Memory"
"Brand New Safe"
"My Heart Belongs To The Sea"
"My Peggy Dear"
"Instructions To Meet The Devil"
"I Want To Make This Moment Last"
"I'm Travelling The River On The Dakota Queen"
"Kiss My Lips"

Personnel
 Tom Brosseau: Vocals, acoustic guitar
 John Parish: Drums, trombone, loops, piano
 Jeremy Hogg: Electric guitar

References

Tom Brosseau albums
2007 albums
FatCat Records albums